Indianapolis Marriott Downtown is a high-rise hotel in Indianapolis, Indiana. It was completed in 2001 and has 19 floors. It was the largest hotel in Indiana until surpassed by the JW Marriott Indianapolis in 2011.

According to the Indianapolis Business Journal, the Indianapolis Marriott Downtown has 365 full-time employees and was last renovated in 2017. As of 2020, four dining options were located in the hotel, including Conner's Kitchen + Bar, Rye Bar, Loaf + Vine Market, and Starbucks.

See also
 List of tallest buildings in Indianapolis

References

 Marriott Indianapolis at Skyscraper Page
 Marriott Indianapolis at Emporis

Skyscraper hotels in Indianapolis
Hotel buildings completed in 2001
Marriott hotels
2001 establishments in Indiana
Hotels established in 2001